WZNN (96.1 FM, "Sports 96.1 The Zone") is a radio station  broadcasting a sports format. Licensed to Stamping Ground, Kentucky, United States, the station serves the Lexington metropolitan area. The station is currently owned by Clarity Communications, Inc. and is operated and managed by LM Communications via a local marketing agreement; it features programming from Fox Sports Radio.

History
The station went on the air as WWUD on March 13, 1992. On May 22, 1992, the station changed its call sign to WKYI, on July 13, 1999, to WULV, on February 16, 2000, to WLRS, and on March 1, 2000, to WLXO.

On Christmas Day 2020, the Hank classic country format moved from WLXO to then-WWRW (105.5 FM), which unlike the 96.1 facility covers the entire Lexington market, with a simulcast continuing for the time being on 96.1. The WLXO call sign moved to 105.5 on June 14, 2021; 96.1 then changed from WWRW to WZNN on August 16, 2021.

On Saturday, August 28, 2021, the format switched from classic country to sports as the new "Sports 96.1, The Zone".

Previous logo

References

External links

ZNN
Sports radio stations in the United States
Scott County, Kentucky
Radio stations established in 1995
1995 establishments in Kentucky